Runcu is a commune in Dâmbovița County, Muntenia, Romania with a population of 4,397 people. It is composed of six villages: Bădeni, Brebu, Ferestre, Piatra, Runcu and Siliștea.

References

Communes in Dâmbovița County
Localities in Muntenia